Smilax pulverulenta, the downy carrionflower, is a North American species of plants native to the eastern and central United States. The plant is fairly common in the Ozarks, the Appalachians, and the Mid-Atlantic States, with isolated populations in Rhode Island, Minnesota, and Nebraska.

Smilax pulverulenta is a climbing vine up to 250 cm (100 inches) tall, without prickles. Flowers are small and green; fruits dark blue to black, without the waxy coating common on other species in the genus.

References

External links
Missouri Plants
Discover Life
Digital Atlas of the Virginia Flora
New York Natural Heritage Program

Smilacaceae
Flora of the United States
Plants described in 1803